The gens Cocceia was a plebeian family at ancient Rome.  The gens is first mentioned towards the latter end of the Republic, and is best known as the family to which the emperor Nerva belonged.

Origin of the gens
According to Syme, the Cocceii came from Umbria.

Praenomina used by the gens
The Cocceii used the praenomina Marcus, Lucius, Sextus, and Gaius, of which Marcus was favored by the Cocceii Nervae.

Branches and cognomina of the gens
The only family of the Cocceii known under the late Republic bore the cognomen Nerva.  A number of personal cognomina were borne by other members of the gens, including Auctus, Balbus, Genialis, Justus, Nepos, Nigrinus, Proculus, Rufinus, and Verus.

Members of the gens

Cocceii Nervae
 Lucius Cocceius Nerva, brought about the reconciliation of Marcus Antonius and Octavianus in 40 B.C.; possibly the same person as Marcus Cocceius Nerva, consul in 36 B.C.
 Marcus Cocceius Nerva, consul in 36 B.C.
 Marcus Cocceius (M. f.) Nerva, a friend of Tiberius, learned in the law, on which he wrote several books, now lost.  He was the grandfather of the emperor Nerva.
 Marcus Cocceius M. f. (M. n.) Nerva, otherwise known as Nerva filius, son of the jurist, in whose footsteps he followed, and father of the emperor.
 Marcus Cocceius M. f. M. n. Nerva, emperor from A.D. 96 to 98.
 Cocceia, sister of emperor Nerva, and wife of Titianus

Others
 Lucius Cocceius Auctus, a prominent architect in the time of Augustus.
 Gaius Cocceius Balbus, consul suffectus in 39 BC.
 Cocceius Caesianus.
 Marcus Cocceius Genialis.
 Cocceius Julianus Synesius.
 Cocceius Justus.
 Cocceius Minicianus.
 Marcus Cocceius M. f. Nepos.
 Marcus Cocceius Nigrinus.
 Cocceius Proculus.
 Cocceius Rufinus.
 Cocceius Vennianus.
 Cocceius Verus.
 Sextus Cocceius Severianus Honorinus, consul suffectus in AD 147.
 Sextus Cocceius Vibianus.
 Marcus Cocceius Anicius Faustus Flavianus, consul suffectus around AD 250.
 Sextus Cocceius Anicius Faustus Paulinus, consul suffectus around AD 260.
 Marcus Cocceius Sex. f. Anicius Faustus Flavianus.

See also
 List of Roman gentes

References

Roman gentes